Chambersburg, Pennsylvania is a borough in the South Central region of Pennsylvania.

Chambersburg may also refer to several places:

Chambersburg, Illinois
Chambersburg, Indiana
Chambersburg Township, Pike County, Illinois
Chambersburg Township, Iredell County, North Carolina
Chambersburg, Missouri
Chambersburg, Trenton, New Jersey, a neighborhood within the South Trenton neighborhood in Trenton, New Jersey
Chambersburg, Ohio
Chambersburg Area Senior High School